"Nightbird" is a 1983 song by the American singer/songwriter Stevie Nicks, written by Nicks with Sandy Stewart. It was the third single from Nicks's second solo album, The Wild Heart. The song, a duet with Stewart, peaked at No. 33 on the Billboard Hot 100 and reached No. 32 spot on the Billboard Top Rock Tracks chart. The song also reached No. 39 on the U.S. Adult Contemporary Chart.

Background
The song was written as a continuation of themes explored in "Edge of Seventeen," namely "the difficulties of female rock 'n' roll singers." In a 1983 MTV interview, Nicks said "Nightbird" was her favorite song from the new album.

Reception
Cash Box said that "a stark keyboard and guitar intro, together with Nicks’ tired, low-ranged croak, provide a melancholic setting depicting the approach of winter and night."

Charts

Notes and references

Timespace – The Best of Stevie Nicks, liner notes
''Crystal Visions – The Very Best of Stevie Nicks, liner notes and commentary

Stevie Nicks songs
1983 singles
Songs written by Stevie Nicks
Song recordings produced by Jimmy Iovine
1983 songs
Modern Records (1980) singles